A list of future observable astronomical events. These are by no means all events, but only the notable or rare ones. In particular, it does not include solar eclipses or lunar eclipses unless otherwise notable, as they are far too numerous to list (see below for articles with lists of all these). Nor does it list astronomical events that have yet to be discovered. And some points of the list miss the last date of the events.

21st century

22nd to 30th centuries

Long solar eclipses

1The eclipse of 2045 will be visible from the United States, producing a path from California to Florida. Some parts of Florida are predicted to experience totality for six minutes, the longest in US history.
2Exceeding 7 minutes of totality, this will be the first time this has happened in 177 years; the last one occurred on June 30, 1973, when the Concorde prototype followed the totality spot for 73 minutes.
3Largest total solar eclipse in the 3rd millennium, with a magnitude of 1.08074 
4Very close to the theoretical maximum.
5"Crowning" this series. This is predicted to be the longest eclipse during the current 10,000-year period, from 4000 BC to 6000 AD (eclipse predictions by Fred Espenak, NASA/GSFC.DEPP).
6"Crowning" this series.
7This will be the longest solar eclipse of the 25th century.
8"Crowning" at the top the series.
9First total solar eclipse visible from London since 2151. The width of its path is predicted to be exceptionally wide at its maximum point.
10"Crowning" this series.
11"Crowning" this series.
12"Crowning" this series.

4th to 8th millennia

9th and 10th millennia
All these dates are in a uniform time scale such as Terrestrial Time. When converted to our ordinary solar time or Universal Time, which is decidedly non-uniform, via ?T, the dates would be about one day earlier. Because of this difference, these dates have no anniversary relation to historical dates and should not be linked to them. Furthermore, they are only astronomical dates, so they are given in the astronomical format of Year Month Day, which allows them to be ordered.

After 10,000 AD
Extremely rare or remarkable astronomical events in the years after the beginning of the 11th millennium AD (Year 10,000).

Calendar projections
This assumes that these calendars continue in use, without further adjustments.

(Some of these are not astronomical events.)

See also 
 Lists of solar eclipses
 Lists of lunar eclipses
 Triple conjunction
 Occultation

Notes

References

External links 
 NASA Six Millennium Catalog of Venus Transits: 2000 BCE to 4000 CE
 Mutual Planetary Transits; Fifteen millennium catalog (archive.org)

Future astronomical events
astronomy
Future